Arend Joan Rutgers (20 October 1903 – 2 September 1998) was a Dutch-Belgian physical chemist.

Arend Joan Rutgers went to high school in Almelo, after which he studied chemistry at the University of Amsterdam. He later obtained his master's degree in 1926 he went to Leiden, where he studied theoretical physics under Paul Ehrenfest. In 1930, he obtained his Ph.D. from the University of Leiden and completed a thesis titled "Bijdrage tot de theorie der thermoelectriciteit in kristallen." (Contribution to the theory of thermo-electricity in crystals). In 1931, he returned to Amsterdam and worked as a research assistant.

In 1933, he became a lecturer at Ghent University in Belgium. In 1938, he was promoted to full professor, and he remained in Ghent until his retirement in 1974. Most of his scientific research was on colloids and surface chemistry, focussing on electrokinetics.

Rutgers was elected a correspondent of the Royal Netherlands Academy of Arts and Sciences in 1948.

References
Citations

Sources
J.Th.G. Overbeek, Obituary Arend Joan Rutgers

1903 births
1998 deaths
Dutch physical chemists
Belgian physical chemists
University of Amsterdam alumni
Leiden University alumni
Academic staff of Ghent University
People from Almelo
Members of the Royal Netherlands Academy of Arts and Sciences